Iskar (also known as Eskar) is a settlement in Baghlan Province, Afghanistan.

See also 
Baghlan Province

Populated places in Baghlan Province